Liz Durden-Myers is a British academic and a senior lecturer in physical education at the University of Gloucestershire and Bath Spa University.

Career 
In 2010, while she was still an undergraduate, Liz founded PE Scholar, a website for sharing physical education resources for PE teachers.

Liz holds a PhD in physical literacy.

In 2021, Liz contributed to the House of Lords report A National Plan for Sport, Health and Wellbeing. She has featured as a keynote speaker in various conferences organized in the area of Physical Education and Physical literacy across the UK and beyond.

In 2022 in a UK political journal, she again called for the government to establish a national plan for sport and recreation. She often comments in the media on topics related to the benefits of physical activity in youngsters.

Books 
Liz is the author of Physical Literacy: A Guide for Educators and a contributor to other books: Is PE in Crisis? Leading Meaningful Change in Physical Education, Learning to Teach Physical Education in the Secondary School, Physical Literacy Across the World, and Researching Difference in Sport and Physical Activity

Liz is a contributor to Perspectives on Flourishing Schools (Rowman and LittleField). She is also a contributor to a number of academic journals.

Personal life 
Liz lives in Bath with her two young sons and her husband.

References

External links
 Liz Durden-Myers' Profile at University of Gloucestershire
 Liz Durden-Myers' profile at Bath Spa University

Living people
British women academics
Women academics
Year of birth missing (living people)